Erik Slutsky (born 1953) is a contemporary figurative painter who lives in Montreal, Quebec, Canada. His work has been exhibited over the past 30 years in more than 50 international exhibitions in the U.S., Canada, Germany and France.

His paintings often depict male and female figures in an urban landscape and many of them contain political and social commentary. There is a complex symbolism which gives a sense of mystery to much of his work. He works mainly in oils on canvas and also mixed media on paper.

His work is found in many public, private and  corporate collections including the Banque Nationale, Dresdner Bank, Musée du Québec, Mercantile Bank, Teleglobe Canada, Sheraton Hotels, The Avmor Collection and many others. He also works as an illustrator, having done many bookcovers, magazine covers and illustrations and posters. One of his  works ("Not A Still Life") was on the cover of ISO Focus Magazine (Volume 1. No.8, September 2004) devoted to food and beverage.

References

Brownstein, Bill, (July 9, 2006) "Artist not sure how his work fits into Iraq Museum show" Montreal Gazette p.A21
Paradis, Andrée (March 1985),"Erik Slutsky, Une énergie a toute épreuve," Vie des Arts, pp. 54–55.
Solomon, Heather (Nov.9, 2006) "Erik Slutsky's Art emanates from Park Avenue" Canadian Jewish News, p. 46
 Solomon, Heather,(May 3, 2001) "Not A Still Life", Canadian Jewish News
La Presse,(Nov. 24, 2006), Actuelle p. 1
Viau, René,  (Autumn, 2006),  "Attention, Bonheur! Erik Slutsky," Vie des Arts, No.204, p. 52-53

Living people
1953 births
20th-century Canadian painters
Canadian male painters
21st-century Canadian painters
Artists from Montreal
Jewish Canadian artists
Jewish painters
20th-century Canadian male artists
21st-century Canadian male artists